Belle Plain may refer to:
Belle Plain, Texas, a ghost town in Callahan County, Texas
Belle Plain College, a defunct college in Belle Plain, Texas

See also
Belle Plaine (disambiguation)
Bell Plain Township, Marshall County, Illinois